Ajahn Khemadhammo OBE (also known as Chao Khun Bhavanaviteht; born ) is a Theravāda Buddhist monk. He is one of the founders of the Thai Forest Tradition in the West.

Biography 
Khemadhammo was born in Portsmouth, England. In 1971, after training at the Royal Central School of Speech and Drama and Drama Centre, London and practising as a professional actor, working for several years at the Royal National Theatre in London with Laurence Olivier and Edward Petherbridge (a period in which he appeared in Shakespearian dramas as well as in plays by Tom Stoppard and Anton Chekov, studying intensively Stanislavski's system), he travelled to Thailand via the Buddhist pilgrimage sites in India. In December 1971 in Bangkok he became a novice monk and about a month later moved to Ubon to stay with Ajahn Chah at Wat Nong Pah Pong : Wat Nong Pah Pong (Generally shortened to: Wat Pah Pong, Thai: วัดหนองป่าพง) is a Theravada Buddhist hermitage in Ubon Ratchathani Province, (Amphoe) Warin Chamrap, devoted to the practice of contemplation, Dhutanga practice and asceticism which was established by the late Ajahn Chah as the main monastery of the Thai Forest Tradition. On the day before Vesakha Puja of that year, 1972, Ajahn Khemadhammo received Upasampadā as a bhikkhu, a fully ordained Buddhist monk.

In 1977, Khemadhammo returned to the UK with Ajahn Chah and stayed with him during his two-month visit at the old Hampstead Vihara. After Ajahn Chah's return to Thailand, Ajahn Khemadhammo remained at Hampstead and eighteen months later set up a small recluse monastery on the Isle of Wight. In 1984, at the invitation of a group of Buddhist Samatha and Vipassanā meditators that he had been visiting monthly for some years, he moved to Banner Hill near Kenilworth and formed the Buddha-Dhamma Fellowship. In 1985, he moved to his current residence, the contemplative Forest   Hermitage, a property in Warwickshire; in 1987, with considerable help from meditator-acolytes and devotees in Thailand, this land was purchased by the Buddha-Dhamma Fellowship. A stupa was built there in 1988 by Sayadaw U Thilawunta, known as the English Shwedagon Pagoda.

Khemadhammo began Buddhist prison chaplaincy work in 1977. In 1985, with the help of others, Angulimala, the Buddhist Prison Chaplaincy, was launched with him as its Spiritual Director. Currently, Luang Por Khemadhammo continues to visit prisons and teach meditation both at his forest hermitage contemplative monastery Vihara and at Warwick University.

Ajahn Khemadhammo was appointed an OBE (Officer of the Most Excellent Order of the British Empire) in the Queen's Birthday Honours, June 2003 for 'services to prisoners'. 

In December 2004, on the birthday of King Bhumibol Adulyadej, he was made a Chao Khun with the ecclesiastical title of Phra Bhavanaviteht. He was only the second foreign-born monk to receive such an honour.

In May 2013 he was awarded an Honorary Doctorate in Vipassanabhavana by Mahachulalongkornrajavidyalaya University, Thailand.

In January 2015, on Burmese Independence Day (Independence Day (Myanmar)), it was announced by the President of Burma that he had been awarded the title Aggamaha Saddhamma Jotikadhaja. This was duly conferred at an investiture ceremony in Nay Pyi Taw, the new capital of Myanmar (Burma), on 4 March 2015. 

He is the Chair of TBSUK – the Theravada Buddhist Sangha in the UK.

References

Sources

External links
Website of the Forest Hermitage (Santidhamma & Bhavanadhamma)
News and Musings - Luangpor Khemadhammo's blog
Angulimala Buddhist Prison Chaplaincy
Dhamma Talks by Ajahn Khemadhammo at Amaravati Buddhist Monastery

This article uses text adapted from the Forest Hermitage's biography of Ajahn Khemadhammo. It is available for free distribution under the terms of the GFDL.

Theravada Buddhist monks
Officers of the Order of the British Empire
Alumni of the Drama Centre London
1944 births
Living people
English Buddhist monks
English Theravada Buddhists
Buddhism in Thailand